Alamgir Ghazi (born 9 November 2002) is a Pakistani footballer who currently plays for WAPDA in the Pakistan Premier League, and the Pakistani national team.

Personal life 
He is cousin of the international striker Muhammad Rasool.

Club career 
In 2020 Ghazi was a member of Pakistan Television F.C. In 2020 he joined Khan Research Laboratories F.C. of the Pakistan Premier League. By 2022 he signed for WAPDA.

International career 
Ghazi represented Pakistan at the youth level in 2020 AFC U-19 Championship qualification. He went on to make four appearances in the campaign.

In August 2022 Ghazi was called up for a trials with the senior national team. In November the same year, he was included in Pakistan's squad for a friendly against Nepal, Pakistan's first fixture in nearly three-and-a-half years because of the Pakistan Football Federation's suspension by FIFA. He made his senior international debut in the starting lineup in the eventual 0–1 away defeat.

International career statistics

References

External links
 
 

Living people
2002 births
Pakistani footballers
Pakistan international footballers
Association football midfielders